Castle thunder is a sound effect that consists of the sound of a loud thunderclap during a rainstorm. It was originally recorded for the 1931 film Frankenstein, and has since been used in dozens of films, television programs, and commercials.

History
After its use in Frankenstein, the Castle Thunder was used in dozens of films from the 1930s through the 1980s, including Citizen Kane (1941), Bambi (1942), Young Frankenstein (1974), Star Wars (1977), Ghostbusters (1984), Back to the Future (1985), and Big Trouble in Little China (1986). Use of the effect in subsequent years has declined because the quality of the original analog recording does not sufficiently hold up in modern sound mixes.

The effect appears in Disney, Peanuts, and Hanna-Barbera cartoons, including the original Scooby-Doo animated series. It can also be heard at the Haunted Mansion attraction at Disney theme parks.

The sound can be found on a few sound effects libraries distributed by Sound Ideas (such as the Network Sound Effects Library, the 20th Century Fox Sound Effects Library and the Hanna-Barbera SoundFX Library).

See also
Wilhelm scream
Howie scream 
Tarzan's jungle call
Goofy holler

References

External links
Video compilation of castle thunder in modern animation
How the crash and roll of castle thunder matches the science of thunderstorms

In-jokes
Sound effects
1931 works
Lightning